Rishikesh railway station, station code RKSH, is a railway terminal station serving the city of Rishikesh in the Indian state of Uttarakhand. It lies on Northern railway network zone of Indian Railways. It is no longer the only station in Rishikesh, as another one has been built to increase capacity, known as Yog Nagari Rishikesh railway station, located 2 km to the west of Rishikesh station.

Location
The railway station is located in Rishikesh in Dehradun district, Uttarakhand, India.

Reduced Level
The RL of the station is 372 m above mean sea level in Mumbai.

Signage
The station signage is predominantly in English, Hindi and Sanskrit.

Source station
The station acts as source station for Hemkunt Express which runs from Rishikesh to Jammu Tawi and Jammu Tawi to Rishikesh. The departure time of the train is 4:20 PM (IST).

See also
Rishikesh–Karnaprayag Railway
Haridwar railway station

References

Railway stations in Dehradun district
Moradabad railway division
Transport in Rishikesh
Year of establishment missing